The sexual abuse scandal in the Peoria diocese is the part of the Catholic sex abuse cases affecting the Roman Catholic Diocese of Peoria in the U.S. state of Illinois.

Allegations against Bishop Myers
From 1987 to 2001, John J. Myers was Coadjutor Bishop then Bishop of Peoria.  Soon after being reassigned from Peoria to Newark, Myers was appointed to the United States Conference of Catholic Bishops' Ad Hoc Committee on Sexual Abuse, to investigate the Catholic sex abuse cases. The affairs involving John Anderson and Francis Engels had reportedly occurred under his watch.

In 2002, Myers was among the two-thirds of sitting bishops and acting diocese administrators that the Dallas Morning News found had allowed priests accused of sexual abuse to continue working.

John Anderson
Rev. John Anderson was first accused in 1993, and was removed from a parish; by 2002 Anderson was the director of the Peoria diocese office for Propagation of the Faith, until he and six other priests were suspended that May by Myers' successor, Bishop Daniel R. Jenky.

Francis Engels
Rev. Francis Engels was the subject of numerous complaints, but accusers say the bishop ignored them until the accusers went to the news media in the early 1990s.  Myers suspended Engels, but later attempted to re-instate him.  Myers later said that he "didn't realize they would be so upset" about re-instatement.  In 2005, Engels pleaded guilty (in an Alford plea) to molesting a Peoria altar boy on trips to Milwaukee in the early 1980s; the victim said Engels told him, "If you tell anybody, they're not going to believe you".
In May 2002, When the Ad Hoc Committee on Sexual Abuse was reorganized in late 2002, Myers was one of three bishops no longer on the committee.

See also
Abuse
Child abuse
Child sexual abuse
Religious abuse
Sexual abuse
Sexual misconduct
Spiritual abuse

References

Peoria
Crimes in Illinois
Incidents of violence against boys
Sexual abuse scandal
Violence against men in North America